Osowiec-Twierdza  is a village in the administrative district of Gmina Goniądz, in Mońki County, Podlaskie Voivodeship, in north-eastern Poland. Osowiec-Twierdza is home to the Biebrza National Park.

History
Excavations have revealed settlements in Osowiec from prehistoric times. Okrasa existed as a village since before 1444 AD. In 1743 to 1827 Osowiec (as Marcinpol) was a city. In the nineteenth century, a railway line was built from Białystok to Ełk, Königsberg, and passing through Osowiec. From 1882 to 1892, the Russian army built a regional military defense strategy. 

Further work built fortifications at the outbreak of World War I. From 1914 to August 6, 1915, the German 8th Army futilely struggled to break the defensive belt represented by Osowiec Fortress, which successfully defended the Tsarist troops. During the fighting, the German army used gas (chlorine), which killed about 2,000 of the Tsar's troops, who made a desperate last stand during the Attack of the Dead Men. Finally, due to an unfavorable strategic situation at the front, the Russian troops left the fort at the end of August 1915. The defense of Osowiec is comparable to the 1916 battle of Verdun, in France.  Both towers (fortress) were  never captured. In the Second World War, there was no struggle for Osowiec.

Today some parts of the fortress are accessible to tourists, especially within the boundaries of Biebrza National Park. The visitor information center of the park is located in Osowiec-Twierdza, a small settlement located within the boundaries of the fortress.
The village has a population of 630. It is most famous for its 19th-century Osowiec Fortress.

Gallery

References